Elms Court is a historic mansion in Natchez, Mississippi, United States.

Location
It is located at 542 John R. Junkin Drive in Natchez, Mississippi.

History
The mansion was built in 1835–1836. Galleries of lacy iron work said to have been brought from Belgium. In 1852, Francis Surget (1784-1856) purchased it for his daughter Jane (Surget) Merrill (1829-1866) and her husband Ayres Phillips Merrill II (1826-1883). Upon Surget's death in 1856, the property (including the house and eight enslaved people) was bequeathed to his daughter Jane.

It has been listed on the National Register of Historic Places since December 2, 1977 and may be unique among Natchez plantation houses in being owned by a supporter of the Union cause leading up to and during the Civil War.

References

Houses on the National Register of Historic Places in Mississippi
Houses in Natchez, Mississippi
Houses completed in 1836
National Register of Historic Places in Natchez, Mississippi